The 1991 Saskatchewan Roughriders season was the 77th season in the club's 81st year of existence. The team finished in 4th place in the Canadian Football League's West Division with a 6–12 record. The Roughriders began the season with a 1–6 record and subsequently fired head coach John Gregory and replaced him with Don Matthews who finished the season with a 5–6 record. The stronger end to the season was not enough as the team failed to qualify for the playoffs for the first time since 1987.

Offseason

CFL Draft

Preseason

Regular season

Season standings

Season schedule

Awards and records

1991 CFL All-Stars 
DS – Glen Suitor

1991 Western All-Stars 
OG – Roger Aldag
OT – Vic Stevenson
DT – Gary Lewis
DS – Glen Suitor
K – Dave Ridgway

References 

Saskatchewan Roughriders seasons
1991 Canadian Football League season by team
1991 in Saskatchewan